Neighbours is an Australian television soap opera. It was first broadcast on 18 March 1985 and currently airs on digital channel 10 Peach. The following is a list of characters that appeared in the show in 2018, by order of first appearance. All characters are introduced by the shows executive producer Jason Herbison. The 34th season of Neighbours began airing from 8 January 2018. Mick Allsop was introduced during the same month, while Rafael Humphreys made his debut in February. March saw the arrival of Chloe Brennan. Bea Nilsson made her first appearance in May. Jemima Davies-Smythe began appearing from September, while Nance Sluggett, Pierce Greyson, Andrew Rodwell and Heather Schilling made their first appearances in October. Valerie Grundy, Delaney Renshaw, Regina Grundy, and Shaun Watkins appeared in December.

Mick Allsop

Mick Allsop, played by comedian Joel Creasey, made his first appearance on 30 January 2018. Creasey's casting was confirmed by Anna Byrne of the Herald Sun in October 2017. Of appearing in the show, Creasey commented, "That was fun because it was a soap opera. It was very over the top, and they were like 'Yes! More!' They're all so nice out at Neighbours. I had a blast doing it." Creasey described Mick as "a new gay in town with a backstory", and "a bit of a misunderstood stalker". Executive producer Jason Herbison praised Creasey's "hilarious" performance and added that his character could return in a recurring capacity in the future. Creasey reprised the role for scenes filmed at Sydney Mardi Gras in 2019. His appearance aired on 28 February 2020. The following year, Creasey reprised the role and returned to the Neighbours set in July 2021 for filming. Creasey commented that it was "a larger role" this time, adding "It's been great because I had my own legendary soap stars on tap each day for advice." His return aired on 3 November 2021. 

Mick comes to Harold's Café for a coffee, where Aaron Brennan (Matt Wilson) recognises him as his stalker from his time in dance troupe Rough Trade. Rory Zemiro (Ash Williams) later claims that Mick has trashed his motel room, before approaching him at the Erinsbrough Backpackers' for a talk. Mick overhears Elly Conway (Jodi Anasta) and Paige Smith (Olympia Valance) discussing Rough Trade and he introduces himself. He tells them that he is a big fan of Rory and not Aaron, as they were led to believe. He also tells them that he and Rory used to have sex, while Rory was dating Aaron. Two years later, during Sydney Mardi Gras, Mick sees Aaron and his partner David Tanaka (Takaya Honda) taking a selfie together and photobombs them. Mick tells them that he recognised Aaron's walk and followed them, before asking what their plans are. Aaron and David then run off down the street and hide from Mick.

The following year, Mick is hired as the front desk manager at Lassiters Hotel and states that he prefers to be called Michel now. He briefly recognises Chloe Brennan's (April Rose Pengilly) surname, before going on a tour of the hotel with Harlow Robinson (Jemma Donovan). Mick later sees Chloe with Aaron and he ducks behind a bush to avoid him. When Mick asks Harlow to organise a birthday celebration for him, she asks him why he applied for a job in a hotel when he has no previous experience. Chloe then confronts Mick about asking a guest to cover up on their way to the pool, but Harlow saves him by saying that he meant for the guest to cover themselves in sunscreen. Mick later tells Chloe about his ideas for redecorating the outdoor areas in a jungle theme, but Chloe tells him that she would prefer him to learn the basics of his job first. Mick later enters Amy Greenwood's (Jacinta Stapleton) apartment while drunk and tells her that he was given the wrong key. He also notices some medicated STD cream on the kitchen bench. Amy soon realises that Mick is squatting in the apartments and took the master key from reception. She threatens to tell Chloe, who has been gathering evidence of Mick's indiscretions, and he counters by threatening to reveal that she has crabs. Mick suggests several ways to improve the hotel, but Chloe tells him that he needs to tone down his ideas. Mick then tries to convince Toadfish Rebecchi (Ryan Moloney) to turn his office into a Santa's grotto, before he runs into David, who asks whether he is after Aaron. Mick assures him that Aaron is not his type anymore and that he wants to keep their history a secret. Chloe later confronts him about stalking Aaron, having learned who he is. Mick wears a crab costume to the Lassiters Christmas party amidst a potential crabs outbreak at the hotel, which attracts the attentions of Amy, Chloe and manager Terese Willis (Rebekah Elmaloglou). Hotel owner Paul Robinson (Stefan Dennis) eventually tells Mick to change, while Amy tells him to stop him shaming her.

When Chloe and Harlow ask Amy for information about the issue at Lassiters, Amy assumes Mick has told them about her having crabs, so she tells them about him squatting at the apartments. Mick then publicly announces that Amy and her boyfriends Ned Willis (Ben Hall) and Levi Canning (Richie Morris) are responsible for spreading the crabs at the hotel, which later turns out to be bed bugs. After being fired, Mick attempts to take a bag of toiletries and stationary from the hotel, but is caught by Chloe and Harlow on the way out. A couple of weeks later, Kyle Canning (Chris Milligan) hires Mick as his and Roxy Willis' (Zima Anderson) wedding planner. Roxy is set to fire Mick, until he shows her a mood board he has worked on, which seems to match the couple's personalities. Roxy is still unsure, but is convinced to keep Mick on when he demonstrates that he knows her better than she thinks and tells her that he can pull anything together quickly. Mick later discusses his new job with Karl Kennedy (Alan Fletcher) and hires him to be the wedding singer. Mick's arrangements fall through and Kyle and Roxy's friends and family sort out the venue together. Months later, Terese and Chloe arrange a meeting with fashion designer Montana Marcel's (Tammin Sursok) assistant and are surprised when Mick turns up. He asks for a massage and a cocktail while Terese and Chloe try to explain their pitch for Montana's Fashion Week. He eventually agrees to arrange a meeting with Montana for them. Mick gives Terese, Chloe and Leo Tanaka (Tim Kano) some suggestions to impress Montana, including adding tiki torches, gladioli, and an ice sculpture to the potential locations for the runways. He accompanies Montana on her visit and it emerges all the things Mick suggested remind Montana of being jilted by her fiancé. Chloe realises that Mick set them up and confronts him, but he wishes her good luck proving it. Mick visits Aaron at the hospital, after an unsuccessful date with porter Dean Covey (Travis Cotton). He tells Aaron that Dean would not stop talking about David and came to warn Aaron. Mick later finds Montana entertaining Leo and she threatens to fire him for sabotaging the Lassiters pitch. He says that it was just a test and Montana tells him that it is lucky he makes her laugh, before asking him to leave them alone.

Rafael Humphreys

Rafael Humphreys, played by Ryan Thomas, made his first appearance on 12 February 2018. The character and Thomas's casting details were announced on 12 October 2017. Unconfirmed reports of his casting were previously published in early September 2017. Thomas explained that he was on holiday when his agent contacted him about the role. After speaking with a producer, he accepted the part as the character was different to those he had played before. He added "I grew up watching the show so to get the chance to join the cast is amazing". Johnathon Hughes of Radio Times observed that Thomas's casting was "a canny coup" for the show, as a well known soap actor would please British viewers. Thomas finished filming his guest stint during the week commencing 20 November 2017.

Rafael was initially billed as being "a mysterious loner with dark secrets", who comes to Erinsborough to confront an incident from his past. Greg Barnett, the commissioning editor at Channel 5, described Thomas as "the perfect handsome devil", whose arrival would bring "darker times" to an established character. Thomas was photographed with actors Olympia Valance and Andrew Morley on set, leading Hughes to speculate that Rafael may be involved with their characters Paige Smith and Jack Callahan. He was also pictured filming scenes with Matt Wilson, who plays Aaron Brennan. Publicity photos later showed Rafael with scars covering his back and it was revealed that he is set to target Paul Robinson (Stefan Dennis) in a revenge storyline.

Rafael visits the Lassiters Complex amid a 90s fancy dress party. He goes to The Waterhole and watches Paul Robinson from afar. After noticing that Paul has left his penthouse key card behind, Rafael takes it and lets himself into the penthouse. He watches on while Paul sleeps. Rafael checks into the Erinsborough Backpackers, and later enquires about a staff wanted poster in the pub. Sheila Canning (Colette Mann) gives him a trial shift. He befriends David Tanaka (Takaya Honda) after helping out with his mixed up meal order, and Sheila is impressed enough to hire him. Rafael asks Sheila about Paul and learns he owns a new housing development called Robinson Heights. David tries to flirt with Rafael and later asks him out for a drink. Rafael tells David that he was born in the UK, but spent a lot of time in South America as that is where his mother was born. Sheila lets Rafael know that David is Paul's son, so he cuts the date short and leaves. Rafael reports Robinson Heights for unsafe work practices. Mishti Sharma (Scarlet Vas) catches Rafael breaking into the building site and he asks her to charge Paul with murder. He explains that his mother died during a fire in a factory owned by Paul. He gleaned from his mother's diary that the factory was unsafe, so he blames Paul for her death. Mishti later tells Rafael that she has been unable to find anything to support his claim, and there is nothing she can do.

Rafael apologises to David and asks him out on another date. David invites Rafael to spend the evening with him at Paul's penthouse, where he is babysitting Gabriel Smith (Kian Bafekrpour). When David goes to check on Gabe, Rafael finds a folder on Robinson Heights and photographs the documentation, including a page about a reimbursement scheme for the former residents, which he then sends to the West Waratah Star newspaper. The paper runs a story about the housing development ripping off pensioners, and Rafael assures David that he did not say anything. Rafael tries to talk to Jayden Warley (Kahn Oxenham) about the safety at Robinson Heights and is overheard by Jayden's mother Sue Parker (Sue Gorman), who wants to know why Rafael is asking questions about Paul's interests. They plot to cause an accident at the site. Paul invites Rafael to a family celebration. When he is alone with David, Rafael shows him his scars and they have sex. Jayden reveals to Rafael that he has been sabotaging the Robinson Heights site for weeks on his mother's orders. Rafael contacts Sue to call off their arrangement, but as he reaches the site, he finds David's brother Leo Tanaka (Tim Kano) trapped under a fallen concrete slab. Rafael starts to call an ambulance, but leaves when Mark Brennan (Scott McGregor) comes across the scene.

Aaron Brennan questions Rafael about Jayden, but Rafael says he does not know him and accuses Aaron of being jealous of his relationship with David. Rafael later catches Aaron going through his belongings and Aaron asks him why he has Sue Parker's business card. Aaron knows that Sue hates Paul and believes Rafael is dating David to get to Paul. Aaron follows Rafael outside and grabs his shirt, which rips and exposes Rafael's scars. Rafael, Sue and Jayden are questioned by the police and Rafael admits to his involvement in the accident at the building site. Paul bails Rafael out and tells him that he does not recall Rafael's mother or the fire, but vows to find out what happened. Rafael assures David that his feelings for him are real despite what has happened. Leo meets with Paul's old business partner Dakota Davies (Sheree Murphy) in London and she later sends him a USB stick containing a document in which she admits to start the factory fire to claim the insurance. Rafael apologises to Paul, who offers to pay his $10,000 fine. Rafael decides to return to the UK to find Dakota. Before he leaves, he tells David to consider giving Aaron another chance.

Chloe Brennan

Chloe Brennan, played by April Rose Pengilly, made her first appearance on 27 March 2018. Pengilly's casting and character details were confirmed on 1 March 2018. She secured the role shortly before moving to Los Angeles, stating "I think it's a goal for most Aussie actors to be on one of these iconic Aussie shows that is beloved world wide, but I'd kind of given up on it, my goal was America." Chloe is the sister of the established Brennan brothers; Mark (Scott McGregor), Aaron (Matt Wilson), and Tyler (Travis Burns). She has been mentioned on-screen by her family several times, and Wilson teased her introduction in July 2017. Chloe comes to Erinsborough to see her brothers, after spending years travelling overseas. Of her character, Pengilly said "Chloe Brennan is one of the most fun, interesting roles I've ever been offered and I'm already having a ball playing her." For her portrayal of Chloe, Pengilly was nominated for Best Soap Newcomer at the 2018 Digital Spy Reader Awards; she came in sixth place with 5.9% of the total votes.

Bea Nilsson

Beatrix "Bea" Nilsson, played by Bonnie Anderson, made her first appearance on 18 May 2018. Anderson's casting details were announced on 5 May. She was initially contracted for two years and the show marks her first major acting role. Anderson auditioned for the role of Chloe Brennan, and was being considered for the part alongside April Rose Pengilly before producers decided to create the additional role of Bea for her. Of her casting, Anderson commented, "I do pinch myself, this is an amazing job to have, even though I started filming in February, it still feels surreal being on set, seeing how it all happens and being a part of it." Bea is the estranged half-sister of Elly Conway (Jodi Anasta) and Susan Kennedy's (Jackie Woodburne) niece. Megan Davies of Digital Spy stated that Bea and Elly have "a tempestuous history", and Elly worries that her sister will turn her life upside down, especially as Bea has "a dark past". On 21 February 2021, a reporter for the Herald Sun confirmed Anderson's departure from the show. Anderson chose to leave so she could concentrate on her music career. She stated "I was like a pig in mud at that place. Neighbours really changed my life for the better in so, so many ways. I feel like at the age I was, 23, when I joined the show it has really shaped me into the person that I am today. I have overcome a lot, I have grown and I am proud of the way I live my life. It was really good to have that structure and now after 3½ years on that show I have decided it is time for me to continue challenging myself and create space to focus on my music and songwriting and more acting." Her final scenes aired on 24 May 2021. It was confirmed that Anderson would be reprising her role as Bea for the serial's finale.

Bea's sister Elly Conway spots her in the Lassiter's Complex, but Elly soon loses sight of her. Bea's aunt Susan Kennedy notices her in the complex the following day and follows her until she stops. Bea admits that she was unsure whether to say hello or not. Susan persuades Bea to come home with her and see Elly. Susan suggests that the sisters get to know each other properly, and Elly apologises to Bea for her behaviour the last time they were together. Elly invites Bea to stay with them, but Bea has already booked an apartment. She agrees to go out for dinner with Elly, who introduces her to Mark Brennan (Scott McGregor). Elly later takes Bea on a tour of the area. When Bea returns to her apartment, she rants to her boyfriend Patrick (Rob Mills) about Elly's perfect life, while she has nothing. He convinces her to resolve things with Elly. After learning that Bea knows her way around cars, Mark offers her an apprenticeship at the local garage but she is reluctant to accept as she learned her skills at a former boyfriend's chop shop. Patrick can see that she wants the job and tells her to contact Mark and accept it. Bea admits that she feels guilty that Patrick is in a wheelchair after he was assaulted by a group of men, who were harassing her. After learning that Bea has met Xanthe Canning (Lilly Van der Meer), Patrick encourages Bea to befriend her. Mark tells Bea about Elly's former boyfriend Finn Kelly, who tried to ruin her life and put Susan in hospital.

Mark accuses Bea of inputting the wrong numbers for the invoices, but Elly comes to her defence and Bea agrees to join her on a girls' night out. Patrick berates Bea when she suggests that his rehab should take place at a hospital. Yashvi Rebecchi (Olivia Junkeer) advises Bea to give her boyfriend space and Patrick buys her a dress as an apology. Bea later confides in Yashvi that she was homeless for a while. When she comes home to find Patrick's wheelchair empty, Bea calls him and he explains that he has been regaining movement in his legs and fell when he went out to test them. Bea brings him home and he proposes. Bea accepts on the condition that he meets her family, but he cancels at the last minute. He later suggests they invite Elly to see them elope. On the day of their elopement, Patrick and Bea take part in the local scavenger hunt until Patrick complains of pain in his legs and they return home. Patrick later goes out to write his vows, and upon his return he tells Bea that he spoke with Elly and she refuses to attend their wedding. On the way to Maryborough, Bea becomes suspicious of Patrick and leaves the car. He chases after her, revealing that he was never paralysed. He knocks Bea out and puts her in a shipping container, where she is later joined by Elly and Susan, who explain that Patrick is actually Finn Kelly. Bea accuses Elly of ruining her life. They are later found by Mark and Karl. After she is checked over, Bea says she will find a hotel, but she begins sleeping in the garage work van, until Elly asks her to move into Number 28.

Susan invites Elly and Bea's mother, Liz Conway (Debra Lawrance) to Erinsborough. Liz confirms Bea's beliefs that Elly asked their mother to kick her out when she was fifteen. However, Elly reveals that Liz told her and Susan that it was not her fault. The sisters realise that Liz has been lying to them both, and when Bea finds a photo in Liz's wallet that she is folded out of, Liz admits that she wanted Bea gone as she reminded her too much of Bea's father, Lars. Elly and Bea ask Liz to leave, but she attempts to make amends by inviting them to lunch, where she gets drunk and talks about herself. Liz later claims she has been mugged by Finn, which causes Bea and Elly to soften towards her until they learn from Mark that she made it all up.

Finn later confronts Bea, Susan, Elly and Xanthe resulting in him being pushed off a cliff by Susan. The incident is ruled as self-defence, and Finn later wakes up from his coma. Finn's brother Shaun Watkins (Brad Moller), who had arrived in town a few months previously, returns to help him despite Ned warning him to stay away. Ned becomes overprotective of Bea and at one point assists Harry Sinclair (Paul Dawber) in his attempt to set up Finn. After this results in Bea's hospitalisation, she breaks up with Ned. She later recommences a relationship with Finn, which Karl, Susan and Elly are initially against. However, in time, Finn comes to be accepted by the Kennedys, especially after they discover Shaun is the father of Elly's baby, and how he blackmailed Elly into letting Finn stay with them. Finn and Bea's relationship appears to be going well until Elly is held hostage by Robert Robinson (Adam Hunter) and he helps Elly give birth to her daughter Aster Conway (Isla Goulas, Scout Bowman). Unknown to Bea, this reignites Finn and Elly's feelings towards each other.

Bea later contacts Finn's father Trent Kelly (Peter Houghton) in an attempt to reunite them. However, this angers Finn, especially after he discovers she did this without telling him and that his father had intended to save him when he was held hostage in Colombia, but gambled the ransom money. Finn's memories also return and he plans to kill Bea. When they head to Pierce Greyson's (Tim Robards) island to celebrate Elly's 35th birthday, Finn pushes Bea down an old mineshaft and leaves her to die. He then lies to the others that she has gone back to Sydney. Harlow Robinson (Jemma Donovan) finds her and attempts to rescue her but is also trapped. Elly eventually discovers that Finn has been deceiving her and he pushes her into the mineshaft as well. The three are later rescued when Paul Robinson (Stefan Dennis) informs the other islanders of Bea's whereabouts. Upon returning to Erinsborough, Bea is horrified to discover that Finn has also murdered Prue Wallace (Denise van Outen) and Gary Canning (Damien Richardson), the latter of whom tried to save her and Harlow. Upon discovering that Elly had feelings for Finn, she is angry, but convinces her to return home. Bea learns that Finn is dead and Elly is accused of murdering him. When Claudia returns to Erinsborough, Bea became suspicious of Claudia. When Elly is sentenced to prison for Finn's murder, Claudia wins custody over Aster. With the help from Aaron and Chloe, Bea realises that Claudia is planning to leave Melbourne with Aster so she and Susan rush to the airport to stop her. As they arrive, they are shocked to find Shaun, alive, confronting Claudia's actions. Elly is bailed from prison and Claudia is charged after turning herself in.

Bea meets and befriends Levi Canning (Richie Morris) and they both volunteer to clear up Pierce's island, with Roxy and Levi's cousin Kyle Canning (Chris Milligan). While clearing up, Levi has a seizure. Levi admits that he hit his head as a child and as a result developed epilepsy. He tells Bea not to tell anyone but Bea is concerned about him keeping it quiet from his family and colleagues. Bea learns that Elly is planning to move to Switzerland with Shaun and Aster, Bea is angry at Elly for not telling her. Bea begs Elly to stay as she needs her, but Elly tells Bea that she needs a fresh start so Bea lets her go, but prefers not to accompany her at the airport. They say their goodbyes outside the house as Elly leaves with Shaun and Aster. Bea is then harassed by Tucker Brunnings, while setting up for her performance at the Waterhole. Bea tells him to back off, but he continues to provoke her and when he mentions Elly, Bea snaps and punches him, which Levi witnesses. Levi supports Bea as she tries to move on without Elly. Bea supports Levi when he has a fall out with his grandmother Sheila Canning (Colette Mann), and when she learns from him that he moved out and is staying at Lassiter's, Bea offers for him to stay at her place. Bea asks Susan for permission, but she refuses. Bea then tells Levi the bad news.

Bea realises that she has a thing for Levi and tells Yashvi about her feelings for him. Yashvi decides to set them up on a date and Bea dresses up and meets Levi at the Waterhole. She begins to flirt with him, but later gets a call from Yashvi that she had interrogated Levi minutes before and confesses to Bea that Levi has no interest in her. Bea takes off, feeling embarrassed. Levi comes to Bea, telling her that Sheila accidentally destroyed his epilepsy medication in the washing machine and asks her to get his medication from the pharmacy. Bea first refuses, but agrees to do so, when Levi has trust in her. When Bea secretly gives Levi his medication, Yashvi has followed Levi and finds him and Bea together. When Yashvi starts questioning Levi for lying to her about his whereabouts, Bea steps in and reveals to Yashvi that she and Levi are secretly dating. Bea then goes to Switzerland to see Elly and Aster. When Bea returns, she helps Levi, when he has a seizure in front of Kyle and Sheila. Bea and Sheila then drive out of Ramsay Street. The following year, Bea returns with Elly to attend Toadie Rebecchi's (Ryan Moloney) wedding reception and party.

Hugo Somers

Hugo Somers  (also credited as Hugo Rebecchi) played by John Turner, made his first appearance on 26 June 2018. Hugo is Andrea Somers' (Madeleine West) infant son. Sindi Watts (Marisa Warrington) brings Hugo to Erinsborough and tells Toadie Rebecchi (Ryan Moloney) that he is Hugo's father. Willow Somers (Mieke Billing-Smith), who previously knew of Hugo's existence, tells the family the details of Andrea's pregnancy and subsequent post-natal depression, culminating in her abandoning Hugo with Sindi. Toadie takes a DNA test and cares for Hugo as he waits for the result, which eventually confirms that Toadie is Hugo's father. Toadie takes Hugo and Willow to visit Andrea in a psychiatric hospital in Hobart, but she does not acknowledge her children. Toadie's wife Sonya Rebecchi (Eve Morey) attempts to bond with Hugo. When she is distracted while changing Hugo, he falls from the change table, but is not badly hurt. Toadie and Sonya hold a naming day for Hugo to officially welcome him to their family, and they give him the nickname Sunfish as per Rebecchi family tradition. Later, Andrea's mother Heather Schilling (Kerry Armstrong) tricks the Rebecchis into hiring her as a live-in nanny, in an attempt to get closer to Hugo and eventually restore Andrea's role in his life, but her deception is uncovered when she attempts to murder Sonya. While still in recovery, Andrea gives full custody of Hugo to Toadie and Sonya, shortly before the latter dies of ovarian cancer. In 2020, Andrea escapes from prison via dressing up her identical twin, Dee Bliss (also West), in a prison suit. She then pretends to be Dee and takes Hugo, before escaping town with Owen Campbell (Johnny Ruffo). Owen eventually admits to Toadie where Andrea, who is still holding Hugo, is hiding. Using Heather, Constable Levi Canning (Richie Morris) lures Andrea into Erinsborough High and Toadie safely manages to get Hugo back. According to Daniel Kilkelly of Digital Spy, Hugo's presence allowed the manipulative Andrea to show a "more human side".

Jemima Davies-Smythe

Jemima Davies-Smythe, played by Magda Szubanski, made her first appearance on 3 September 2018. The character and Szubanski's casting details were announced on 30 May 2018, along with details of the show's first same-sex wedding. Of her guest role, Szubanski said, "I thought it was just one of the best offers I've had for a long time. I thought it was both hilarious and historic so when they asked me I just jumped at it. I think it's gold." Szubanski, who led the "yes" campaign for marriage equality law in Australia, plays marriage celebrant Jemima, who marries David Tanaka (Takaya Honda) and Aaron Brennan (Matt Wilson). Jemima is also revealed to have a connection to "Ramsay Street royalty". It was later confirmed that she is Karl Kennedy's (Alan Fletcher) half-sister. 

Jemima is contacted by her half-brother Karl Kennedy, but she tells him she does not want to meet him. However, she later travels to  his home town of Erinsborough, where she overhears that Aaron Brennan and David Tanaka need a celebrant. Jemima steps in for Susan Kennedy (Jackie Woodburne) and uses her speech. After the wedding, Jemima finds that the front grill of her car fell off when Susan leant against it. Karl offers to cover the cost and gives Jemima a business card, leading her to realise that he is her half-brother. Karl explains that he and Susan went to Echuca to find her, but Jemima says that she was not sure if she wanted to meet another half-sibling. Karl invites Jemima to stay with him and Susan, and they bond over their shared love of music. Susan starts to suspect that Jemima is a freeloader when she forgets her purse while out to lunch more than once, and allows Karl to pay for further repairs to her car.

Jemima befriends Sheila Canning (Colette Mann) when she offers to teach her how to speed read. They also bond over the fact that Susan appears to look down on them. Paul Robinson (Stefan Dennis) recognises Jemima and tells her that he knows her secret. They have lunch together, and Jemima overhears Susan telling Paul that she is a gold digger. Jemima redecorates Number 28 in the Danish Hygge style. She later encourages Karl to knock down some shelving units at the house. However, Susan is not pleased and asks Jemima to leave. When Karl refuses to throw his sister out, Jemima realises she can trust him and reveals that she is a multi-millionaire. Jemima explains that she earns money from a song she wrote about riding the tram, which was something she used to do with her father. Jemima plans to stay in Erinsborough, which prompts Susan to tell Jemima that she was hurt when Jemima changed the words to her speech at Aaron and David's wedding. Susan also apologises for calling her a gold digger and they make up. Jemima then announces that she wants to take care of Karl and Susan financially. After receiving a call from her daughter, Trudy, Jemima explains to Susan that Trudy and her grandson are just after her money. Karl and Susan turn down Jemima's offer, as Karl believes her money has poisoned her relationships. Susan encourages Jemima to reconcile with her daughter, and Jemima decides to visit her in Boston. Karl and Susan wave Jemima off from the hotel and discover she has gifted them a toy tram.

Nance Sluggett

Nance Sluggett, played by Denise Drysdale, made her first appearance on 3 October 2018. Drysdale's casting details were announced on 27 June 2018. She began filming her first scenes that same week. Of joining the cast, Drysdale said "I am very, very excited about it! I have been around as long as the show so to be finally doing a role on it is quite an honour and everyone has been so welcoming."

The identity of Drysdale's character was not immediately released. But Sophie Dainty of Digital Spy reported that she would "make life very difficult for a particular local resident." The serial's executive producer Jason Herbison said the character would be "eccentric" and will perplex viewers "with her antics." On 24 September, it was announced that Drysdale would be playing Nance Sluggett, the mother of criminal Jeremy Sluggett (Tamblyn Lord). She comes to the Flametree Retreat to collect $100,000 that Jeremy left with Gary Canning (Damien Richardson). But when Gary admits that he has spent the money, Nance asks for free treatments in return for keeping her son off Gary's back. Dainty's colleague Daniel Kilkelly wondered if Nance and Gary's arrangement would become something more, saying, "With a flirtatious look in her eye, could Nance also have more than just treatments on her mind?"

Nance comes to The Flametree Retreat to collect her son, Jeremy's money from Gary Canning. He attempts to put her off, but Nance realises that he has spent the money. Gary explains that he paid for his daughter's university fees. Nance asks Gary to give her a foot rub, while she thinks about what to do. Nance invites Susan Kennedy (Jackie Woodburne) to join her. Nance continues to receive free treatments from Gary. A few weeks later, Nance returns to collect the money, as Jeremy is up for parole. But she then informs Gary that she can stop Jeremy from getting parole if Gary gives her a job as assistant manager at the retreat. Nance clashes with Gary's mother Sheila Canning (Colette Mann), leading her to cancel the deal with Gary.

Pierce Greyson

Pierce Greyson, played by Tim Robards, made his first appearance on 5 October 2018. The character and casting details were announced on 19 July 2018. The show's executive producer Jason Herbison stated that Robards went through "a full audition process" and worked with several of the show's actors, before he was cast. Robards commented, "I've been putting in the work behind closed doors with different coaches – pushing myself out my comfort zone and then this role came up so I'm super excited. I watched Neighbours as a kid so to be on the set with such iconic characters like Paul Robinson, Toadie and Susan is an amazing experience – the entire cast and crew have been so welcoming." Pierce is a rich investor, who is billed as being a mix of Harvey Specter, Christian Grey and Robert Redford. Mat Whitehead of Ten Daily commented, "Pierce Greyson – which is exactly the sort of name you'd expect for someone who is as handsome as he may be mysterious – Robards is set to 'arrive in style'." Pierce also finds romance during his time in Erinsborough. The character departed on 19 November 2018, but on 14 February 2019, Robards announced that he would be reprising the role and joining the full-time cast. Pierce returns during the episode broadcast on 21 May 2019. 

In August 2020, it was announced that the character would be leaving the show, with Robards originally due to film his final scenes in September. However, Robards chose to finish up four weeks early amidst the COVID-19 pandemic, so he could return to Sydney to be with his wife, who was expecting their first child. Robards stated "I made the gut-wrenching decision to depart Neighbours early, as my responsibilities as a husband and father have to take precedence." The role of Pierce was recast to Don Hany, who said "I'm thrilled to have been invited to be part of a show that is part of Australian television history. I've never done the show before so it's all new, and I'm so happy to be here. It's a testament to the resilience of the show that it's still running at a time like this." The character's last scenes aired on 27 November 2020. Hany reprised the role the following year, and Pierce returned on 2 June 2021. On 8 March 2022, it was confirmed that Robards had reprised the role for an upcoming storyline set and filmed in Sydney. Robards also returned to set in Nunawading for the story, which sees Hendrix marry his girlfriend Mackenzie Hargreaves (Georgie Stone) ahead of a lung transplant operation.

Pierce watches on as Chloe Brennan repairs her dress with safety pins, before she greets him and explains that she will be looking after him during his stay at Lassiters Hotel. After a tour of the hotel, Pierce asks Chloe about a Cash4Company business card he found, but she changes the subject. While they are in The Waterhole, Pierce rings the number on the card, having worked out that Chloe is behind the business. Chloe tells him that it is nothing to do with the hotel and offers to resign, but Pierce wants to hire her services. Pierce hires out the Back Lane Bar and then books Chloe's services using a pseudonym, so does not refuse to go on a date with him. Pierce meets with Lassiter's Head of Business Affairs, Leo Tanaka (Tim Kano), and asks him if Chloe can accompany him on a tour of the Melbourne graffiti laneways. After their night out, Pierce asks Chloe back to his room for sex in return for payment, but Chloe does not go. She reconsiders Pierce's proposal, but after he presents her with a necklace, she leaves without having sex with him. Hotel manager Terese Willis (Rebekah Elmaloglou) assigns Chloe to assist Pierce with plans for a wine tasting event. Pierce is initially cold towards Chloe, telling her that when it comes to business, he is detached.

After learning that her brother Tyler Brennan (Travis Burns) has been released from prison, Chloe hugs and kisses Pierce, as she changes her mind about having sex with him. Pierce later sends an expensive bottle of wine and the necklace to Chloe's house as payment, despite Chloe having had sex with Pierce based on genuine feelings. Paul Robinson (Stefan Dennis) convinces Pierce to join him in buying out the minority shareholders in Lassiters. But after Chloe explains that Paul has a grudge against Terese, he listens to Terese's pitch and agrees to partner with her instead. Pierce continues to date Chloe and falls in love with her. He takes her to a ski resort, where she tells him that she has Huntington's disease. The following morning, he finds Chloe has run away and learns that she does not have romantic feelings for him. Paul blackmails Pierce into dropping out of the Lassiters deal with Terese by threatening to reveal his relationship with Chloe to his business partners. Pierce apologises to Chloe for pressuring her, while she apologises for running off. Pierce pays Chloe's debts to her mother and offers to fund her future medical treatment. Later that night, Terese comes to Pierce's room to asks if there is anything she can do to change his mind, but he turns her down and leaves Erinsborough.

Pierce returns the following year. He and Chloe have a brief catch up, and he offers his support when she struggles to deal with the fact that she cannot comfort her brother Mark Brennan (Scott McGregor) and Elly Conway (Jodi Anasta) through their break-up because of the part she played in it. Chloe later asks Pierce for some advice for Kyle Canning (Chris Milligan), who is preparing a business pitch. Sheila Canning (Colette Mann) notices Pierce with a ring and Leo tells Chloe that Pierce has hired out the Back Lane Bar, which makes her think that he is going to propose to her. At the bar, she tries to let him down gently and kisses him goodbye just as his fiancée Ebony Buttrose (Christie Hayes) walks in. Pierce convinces Ebony that nothing is going on with him and Chloe. Pierce and Ebony establish their respective businesses at Lassiters, and Ebony encourages Pierce to buy a racehorse, which he later learns is stolen. Pierce also buys a house, but Ebony tells him they cannot move in until the decorators have finished. However, when he stops by unexpectedly, he finds Chloe there. He asks Mark to talk to Chloe, as he thinks she is obsessed with his relationship, but Mark tells him to talk to Ebony, who explains that her sister was living in the house, as she had no where else to go. Ebony also admits that she was giving her sister money that Pierce gave her for the perfume business. Pierce asks Ebony to sign an agreement in which she agrees to commit to their relationship, without profiting from it, or he will give her $250,000 to walk away. Ebony signs the agreement and Pierce thanks Chloe for her help. However, Ebony is troubled by the continued chemistry between the pair and changes her mind, taking the money and leaving Pierce. Pierce and Chloe grow closer after Ebony's departure and he is disappointed when she starts dating Elly. This does not work out and Chloe and Elly decide to stay friends. Soon after, Pierce and Chloe begin a relationship. Pierce's estranged son Hendrix Greyson (Benny Turland) is expelled from boarding school and he moves in with Pierce and Chloe. Pierce tries to bond with him but he struggles with Hendrix's spoilt wayward behaviour.

Pierce and Chloe become engaged at the Melbourne Cup and decide to marry quickly due to Chloe's Huntington's. Hendrix is unhappy with their plans and Pierce discovers he has developed a crush on Chloe after he kisses her. He reacts badly and Hendrix decides to move back in with his mother, but Pierce stops him at the last minute. Pierce and Chloe marry with Hendrix's blessing. In the New Year, Hendrix's mother Lisa Rowsthorn (Jane Allsop) visits Erinsborough and confesses to her son that Pierce did want to parent Hendrix, but she refused to let him become involved. Lisa tells Pierce she wants another baby and asks him to be a sperm donor. After Chloe admits that she may want to have a baby one day, Pierce rejects Lisa. Pierce's professional rivalry with Paul turns personal when Paul disapproves of Hendrix's relationship with his granddaughter Harlow Robinson (Jemma Donovan). Pierce and Chloe organise a birthday celebration for Elly on Pierce's private island. The trip is derailed when Finn Kelly (Rob Mills) attacks the guests and sets the island alight. Pierce and Chloe escape the island unscathed but decide to sell the island. When the sale falls through, Pierce and Chloe decide to set up a camp for young people on the island. Chloe struggles to manage their new venture and working at Lassiters, so Paul hires Naomi Canning (Morgana O'Reilly) as a temporary events manager. Pierce and Naomi are old friends from Sydney and Naomi develops a crush on Pierce. As her relationship with both Pierce and Chloe grows strong, Naomi suggests that they have a threesome. Believing it was what the other wants, Pierce and Chloe agree but back out at the last minute. An embarrassed Naomi leaves town and Pierce and Chloe commit to working on their ongoing communication problems. Chloe fears she is experiencing Huntington's symptoms but discovers she is pregnant. She wrestles with whether she wants a baby, fearing it will have inherited the Huntington's gene from her. Pierce is thrilled when she tells him, but they agree to decide whether to continue the pregnancy after a 10-week test for Huntington's markers. Chloe's mother Fay Brennan (Zoe Bertram), who has advanced Huntington's, comes to stay with the family to give Chloe's brothers a break. Pierce hires Nicolette Stone (Charlotte Chimes) as a live-in nurse for Fay, but the pair dislike one another and Pierce resents Nicolette and Chloe's closeness. He begins confiding in his neighbour Dipi Rebecchi (Sharon Johal), who is experiencing marriage problems. Pierce and Chloe get good news about their baby's Huntington's markers. Their joy is short-lived as Chloe miscarries. Pierce unfairly blames Nicolette and kicks her out when he realises she is in love with Chloe. Fay returns to Adelaide and Chloe briefly accompanies her, increasing the distance between her and Pierce. In her absence, Pierce clashes with Dipi's husband Shane Rebecchi (Nicholas Coghlan) about his repeated failure to support his wife. When Chloe returns, she enrols them in a cooking class run by Dipi, but they end up in a big argument and Pierce decides to stay at the hotel. Pierce and Dipi kiss after comforting one another about their crumbling relationships, but agree it was a mistake and commit to making their marriages work.

Pierce makes a romantic gesture by naming his new wine "Chloe Greyson", but Chloe is angered that he has used the married name she never took. When Chloe insists on reconciling her friendship with Nicolette, Pierce turns to Dipi and they have sex. They begin an affair and Pierce (now Don Hany) increasingly turns to Dipi about his problems. Paul sees them together and blackmails Pierce into selling him his share of Lassiter's. Still unhappy with Hendrix and Harlow's relationship, Paul threatens to expose the affair unless Pierce moves his family away from Erinsborough. Chloe and Hendrix object to Pierce's plans, and Chloe later walks in on Pierce and Dipi having sex. She tells Pierce their marriage is over and although he initially fights for a reconciliation, Paul helps him realise that his marriage was broken long before he began his affair. When Dipi hears that Pierce and Chloe have split permanently, she proposes that they start a relationship with one another. He rejects her and tells her that she should fix her marriage with Shane. He decides to move to Sydney for a fresh start. Hendrix refuses to go with him so Pierce arranges for him to stay with their neighbours Karl (Alan Fletcher) and Susan Kennedy (Jackie Woodburne).

Six months later, Pierce returns to Erinsborough to oversee the sale of the winery. Hendrix is hurt when he realises his father has returned for his business rather than to see him, but Karl helps rebuild their relationship by arranging for Pierce to give Hendrix driving lessons. Pierce learns that Chloe is in a relationship with Nicolette and voices his concerns that she is only with Nic to overcome her grief for Fay, who has recently died. Nicolette becomes increasingly insecure about Pierce and Chloe spending time together and taunts Pierce by saying she is giving Chloe the baby he never could give her, when in reality she is acting as a surrogate for Chloe's brother Aaron Brennan (Matt Wilson) and his husband David Tanaka (Takaya Honda). Pierce expresses his concerns about Nicolette to Leo when he returns to Erinsborough to buy the winery. With his relationships with Hendrix and Chloe more amicable, Pierce returns to Sydney.

Hendrix and his girlfriend Mackenzie visit Pierce (now Robards once more) in Sydney. He is devastated when Hendrix reveals that he has Pulmonary fibrosis and needs a lung transplant. Hendrix and Mackenzie become engaged, and Pierce flies back to Melbourne to help them plan a shotgun wedding ahead of Hendrix's transplant. He apologises to Chloe for asking Leo to spy on her and Nicolette during his last visit, but quickly clashes with Nicolette again when he learns she is baking Hendrix and Mackenzie's wedding cake. Hendrix gets mad at Pierce for this and reinvites Nicolette, whilst Mackenzie's father criticises Pierce for believing giving Hendrix money is the solution to everything. Pierce goes to their wedding, where Hendrix thanks him, and Pierce accompanies others in sending Hendrix off at the hospital ahead of his operation. Pierce learns that the new lungs have been rejected and Hendrix only has a few hours left to live. Hendrix dies around Pierce, Lisa and Mackenzie, and his funeral is hosted a week later.

Andrew Rodwell

Andrew Rodwell, played by David Lamb and later Lloyd Will, made his first appearance on 23 October 2018. Will assumed the role after Andrew's third appearance. Andrew is introduced as the local Erinsborough police lieutenant and later sergeant. Andrew continues to make appearances in a guest capacity until 2022, as his wife, Wendy Rodwell (Candice Leask), and his daughter, Sadie Rodwell (Emerald Chan), are gradually introduced. Neighbours executive producer, Jason Herbison, revealed plans for a new family, by saying, "We also have a new family moving into the street." On screen, viewers see Andrew and Wendy eventually decide to buy 26 Ramsay Street. Will and his Rodwell co-stars were then added to the opening titles. Will revealed in an interview, "My character was just a tiny little daily for two episodes and I thought that was going to be it. And then I just kept getting invited back, and every time, you know, there was something going down at the police station, I was just invited back. And then I got a promotion to being a sergeant and they were like, 'By the way, you've got a family.' And then I'm like, 'Really? Okay, cool, sweet.'" He also said of meeting Leask, "And then the police ball came around and we met." Will also praised the crew members for styling the Rodwell house "very well." Script producer Shane Isheev later revealed that more of Andrew's children would have been introduced if it were not for the serial's cancellation. The character's final appearance aired on 28 July 2022 as part of the serial's finale, with Daniel Kilkelly of Digital Spy saying, "It's a real shame that we won't get to see more stories for the Rodwells."

Andrew stands guard outside Cassius Grady's (Joe Davidson) hospital room. When Sheila Canning (Colette Mann) notices Andrew yawning, she convinces him to briefly leave his post and get a coffee. The following year, he is assigned to guard the amnesiac Finn Kelly (Rob Mills), including on a visit to Ramsay Street. In 2020, he informs Hendrix Greyson (Ben Turland) that he faces a fine and licence ban for illegally driving his father's car. In 2021, Andrew and Yashvi Rebecchi (Olivia Junkeer) track down Kane Jones (Barry Conrad) and arrest him. At the station, they question Kane about his crimes and the kidnapping of Harlow Robinson (Jemma Donnovan). Andrew and Levi Canning (Richie Morris) investigate an assault on Roxy Willis (Zima Anderson) at Eden Hills University a few weeks later. Andrew tells Levi and Bea Nilsson (Bonnie Anderson) that there are no cameras and no witnesses, before Levi finds a distinctive ring in the undergrowth. Andrew later arrests Brent Colefax (Texas Watterston) with the help of Kurt Bridges (Jeff Gobbels). Weeks later, Levi congratulates Andrew on his promotion to sergeant. Andrew asks why Levi is at work when he is supposed to be on leave and Levi tells him he just wanted to check out the noticeboard for anything new. Later, Andrew informs Rose Walker (Lucy Durack) that her recently smashed in car windscreen was broken by Anna Buke (Fiona Macleod), who was under the impression that it was Melanie Pearson's (Lucinda Cowden) car.

When Isla Tanaka-Brennan (Mary Finn; Axelle Austin) is taken from her car, Andrew questions Aaron Brennan (Matt Wilson) and David Tanaka (Takaya Honda). When Andrew asks Levi if he has plans with his partners, Levi explains that he does not have partners, but rather his girlfriend, Amy Greenwood (Jacinta Stapleton), has another boyfriend. The following day, Andrew hands Levi a photoshopped image of Levi and Ned Willis (Ben Hall) that he found taped to Levi's locker. Rodwell asks Levi if he wants to make an official complaint, but Levi refuses as he does not want to encourage his colleagues. Two months later, Rodwell attends the Erinsborough police ball with his wife, Wendy Rodwell, where he kicks out Levi, Ned, Amy and Reuben Elliot (Lee Jankowski), after they almost get into a fight. Later, Rodwell allows Levi to take Freya Wozniak (Phoebe Roberts) on a joy ride in a police car. A few days later, Rodwell picks up Amy's daughter, Zara Selwyn (Freya Van Dyke), to hang out with his daughter, Sadie Rodwell. After a fire at Erinsborough High School, Rodwell attempts to reassure Sadie before her police interview, however later discovers that Sadie was the culprit. Shortly after, he and Wendy purchase 26 Ramsay Street from Sheila, although Kyle Canning (Chris Milligan) attempts to talk him out of the sale. Andrew helps his daughter find closure after Hendrix Greyson (Ben Turland) dies from lingering effects of the fire. Weeks later, Andrew finds Sadie knocked unconscious after she is hit on the head by Corey Smythe-Jones (Laurence Boxhall). The Rodwells decide to put their house up for sale, but later renounce the sale. Andrew attends Melanie and Toadie Rebecchi's (Ryan Moloney) wedding and reception party on Ramsay Street.

Heather Schilling

Heather Schilling (also credited as Alice Wells), played by Kerry Armstrong, made her first appearance on 25 October 2018. Armstrong's casting and character details were announced on 27 August. Of joining the cast, the actress stated "It is not often you get to be so creative in your own backyard so when the producers asked me to play the role of Alice Wells in Neighbours it was simply irresistible." Alice was billed as a "demure and kind-hearted shortbread baking" grandmother, who shows a darker side when she comes up with "a shocking plan" for one of the show's families. Armstrong said Alice would push boundaries, and the actress was encouraged by the producers to see how far she could go with her character. In the November 2018 issue of Soap World, it was revealed that Alice is Andrea Somers' (Madeleine West) mother. After she helps with their children, Sonya Rebecchi (Eve Morey) and Toadfish Rebecchi (Ryan Moloney) hire Alice as a live-in nanny. Armstrong reprised the role on 17 June 2019. The following month it was confirmed that Heather is also the biological mother of Dee Bliss (West), who was adopted by the Bliss family. Armstrong reprised the role the following year, and Heather returns on 18 May 2020.

Heather notices Sonya Rebecchi struggling with her children Nell and Hugo in Harold's Store, and helps her out by taking Nell to the toilet. She introduces herself as Alice Wells and offers to watch the children as Sonya works from home. Sonya and Toadie take Alice out to The Waterhole for a drink to say thank you. Alice explains that she came to pack up her daughter's belongings, after she went overseas, and Alice plans to reunite with her grandchildren, who she has not seen in a long time. Sonya and Toadie ask Alice if she would consider babysitting their children again, and she suggests that she could be a live-in nanny and they hire her. It emerges that Alice is Hugo's grandmother and Andrea Somers' mother, the woman who conned the Rebecchis. Alice begins manipulating the Rebecchis, convincing Toadie to pay for expensive treatment for Andrea and to keep it from Sonya, which causes an argument. She later convinces Nell to hide during a Halloween event, and pretends that she does not know where she is, sparking a search. Alice then calls the DHS, who question Toadie and Sonya. When Toadie tells Alice that her services are no longer needed, as Nell and Hugo have daycare places, Alice gives Nell food poisoning to keep her job. Alice manipulates Nell into saying that she wants to stay with her, instead of going to daycare.

Alice listens in on Sonya's AA meeting and learns that she is scared to take medication for a tension headache, so Alice crushes up some painkillers into a drink for her. Alice later visits Andrea to tell her about her plan to split Toadie and Sonya up, while Toadie learns from Andrea's daughter Willow Somers (Mieke Billing-Smith), that her grandmother is also a scam artist called Heather Schilling. Alice fakes a hand injury to get Codeine, which she secretly feeds to Sonya so she will develop a dependency on it. Alice deliberately hits her hand with a rolling pin to gain more painkillers, and suggests to Sonya's sister-in-law that Sonya is drinking again. She also learns that Toadie and Sonya are searching for Andrea's mother, and are expecting some information from a private detective. Alice strikes Toadie's assistant Piper Willis (Mavournee Hazel) over the head with a crowbar and steals the envelope containing Andrea's file. Alice amends the file to say that Andrea's mother is dead. She then stops giving Sonya the painkillers so that she develops withdrawal symptoms. Sonya becomes sick and is hospitalised after becoming dehydrated.

After Alice overhears Toadie declaring his love for Sonya, she decides to kill Sonya so Toadie will be free for Andrea. Alice soaks Sonya's gardening gloves in pesticide and then encourages her to work at the nursery, so she has to wear them. During a food break, Sonya licks her fingers and ingests the pesticide. She becomes seriously ill and asks Alice to pull over. Alice refuses to call an ambulance and watches as Sonya passes out. When she comes to, Alice explains that she had to poison her, as she wanted herself, Toadie, Hugo and Andrea to be a family. Alice apologises and then leaves Sonya to die. Willow comes to visit Toadie and Sonya, and finds her grandmother Heather posing as their nanny. Heather tells her about her plan and when she catches Willow texting Toadie, she locks Willow in the shed at the nursery. Heather flees Erinsborough and learns from Willow that Sonya has been found alive. She visits Andrea to tell her that her plan has gone wrong. When Andrea becomes upset, Heather tells her that when the time is right, she must tell Toadie about the person at the Salamanca Markets.

Months later, Heather surprises Andrea at her apartment in Geelong, having been kicked out of her friend's home. Andrea urges her to hide in the bathroom to avoid being seen by Willow. Heather overhears Willow mentioning that she used to lock Andrea up, and confronts Andrea about her lies when they are alone. Andrea allows Heather to stay at her apartment, while she moves into Lassiters, and urges her to lay low. However, Heather comes to Erinsborough and sees Andrea arguing with Ian Packer (Nathan Carter). Andrea later tells her mother that the police are ramping up their search for her, before learning she has been visiting Erinsborough. Heather copies down Ian's number from Andrea's phone, and later seduces him for information about Karen, the woman that Andrea looks like. Andrea catches them together and berates her mother, telling her that Karen is not a threat. She also asks Heather about a red-headed woman she recalled during her hypnotherapy session. Ian later returns and Heather asks him to keep their relationship a secret from Andrea. She then convinces Ian to tell her where Karen is, as she wants to make sure she will not return and ruin Andrea's life.

Heather travels to Byron Bay with Andrea following, and sets up a meeting with 'Karen' who is revealed to be Dee, resulting in Andrea pushing her off a cliff. Dee poses as Andrea so she can convince Heather to return to Erinsborough and Heather and Andrea are arrested. It is later learned that Heather is Andrea and Dee's mum, she recalls having given birth to two babies in which one was unknowingly taken from her by a nun and given to the Bliss family. Although Heather is remorseful for her actions, Dee decides to cut all ties with Heather and Andrea, and they are left in prison.

A year later, while visiting Andrea, Dee notices Heather walking through the prison and decides to organise a visit. Although Heather continues to show remorse for her past, Dee's decision to continually visit her angers Toadie. When he tries to prevent them from seeing each other, Dee becomes annoyed and after a series of issues, they break up. Meanwhile, Andrea vents her anger about not being able to see Hugo to Heather, who refuses to help her in any scheme. Dee asks Heather about her and Andrea's biological father, but Heather claims not to remember him. She later tells Karl Kennedy (Alan Fletcher) that his name is Peter Wilson. On another of Dee's visits, prison guard Owen Campbell (Johnny Ruffo) helps Andrea to escape by drugging Dee, so Andrea can change into her clothes. When Dee wakes up, Heather realises she is not Andrea. She and Toadie eventually convince the prison staff that Andrea has escaped. After learning that Andrea has taken Hugo, Heather works with the police to get him back. She contacts Andrea and tells her she is also on the run. They arrange to meet at Erinsborough High School, where Andrea is arrested and Hugo returned to Toadie. Although Toadie thanks her, he later visits Heather and says that he blames Dee's decision to reconnect with her for Andrea's actions. Heather later arranges a prison transfer due to this, and Dee leaves to meet her father Peter in Alaska.

Valerie Grundy

Valerie Grundy, played by Patti Newton, appeared on 21 December 2018. Newton's casting was announced on 10 December, while Valerie's appearance had previously been teased in spoilers for the show's 8000th episode. The character's surname is a tribute to Reg Grundy, who produced Neighbours in the 1980s. Valerie is a "shy and reclusive" woman, who has lived in the corner house of Ramsay Street for 34 years. Her death brings the local community together, while Toadfish Rebecchi (Ryan Moloney) goes inside her house and discovers she was a hoarder, who has acquired a variety of items from the residents of the street over the years.

Val greets Aaron Brennan (Matt Wilson) and David Tanaka (Takaya Honda) as she passes through the Lassiters Complex, before Yashvi Rebecchi (Olivia Junkeer) apologises to her for kicking a football over her fence. As Val returns to her home on the corner of Ramsay Street, she waves hello to Toadfish Rebecchi and Piper Willis (Mavournee Hazel), who wonders whether to interview Val for her vlog. Later that day, Piper tells Toadie that she has tried knocking on Val's door, but there was no answer and Val's dog, Regina (Timba), is continuously barking. Piper and Toadie go inside and find that Val has died of a heart attack.

Delaney Renshaw

Delaney Renshaw, played by Ella Newton, made her first appearance on 21 December 2018. Newton's casting and character details were announced on 6 December. Delaney is the daughter of a "notorious" Sydney crime family, who have been mentioned on-screen several times since the arrival of Leo Tanaka (Tim Kano) in 2016. Delaney comes to Erinsborough to see Leo after informing him that her father and uncle are up for parole. She also makes it clear that she wants a romantic relationship with him now that she is an adult. Kilkelly branded Delaney "troublesome". Bridget McManus and Melinda Houston of The Sydney Morning Herald called the character a "femme fatale" and said "Delaney (Ella Newton, Harrow) continues to wreak thrilling havoc behind the scenes."

Delaney contacts Leo Tanaka to inform him that her father and uncle will be released from prison soon. Delaney comes to Erinsborough to see Leo and declares her love for him, but Leo tells her that he is in a relationship and nothing is going to happen between them. Delaney stays at Lassiters Hotel and discovers Leo is dating manager Terese Willis (Rebekah Elmaloglou). She propositions him in the hotel sauna, and threatens to tell her father and uncle that he was the person who informed on them if he does not enter into a relationship with her. Leo and his father Paul Robinson (Stefan Dennis) give Delaney a number of free items from the hotel to keep her happy. She later comes to Paul to ask for his help with Leo, and tells him that Mannix Foster (Sam Webb) died as a result of Paul leaving him in the middle of nowhere while injured. She uses the information and a recording made just before Mannix died to blackmail Paul. Leo breaks up with Terese, but is reluctant to be intimate with Delaney. When Terese comes face to face with Leo and Delaney in the elevator, he kisses Delaney to show that he has moved on. Delaney receives a phone call and tells the person on the other end that Leo has no idea what is going on. She later catches Terese with her phone, but Terese tells her that she was just putting it back, after it fell out of her bag.

Delaney tells Leo that her father and uncle got parole, and reveals that she is fearful of seeing her father. Leo spends the night with Delaney, but they do not have sex. He later tells Delaney that he cannot pretend to love her anymore and ends their relationship, as he is in love with Terese. Paul advises Delaney that she cannot make someone love her, and offers her a job with a Lassiters hotel abroad. After seeing Leo beg Terese for a second chance, Delaney returns to her hotel room to find her father Raymond Renshaw (Frank Magree) and uncle Ivan Renshaw (Michael Shanahan) waiting for her. Raymond learns that Delaney came to Erinsborough to see Leo, as she fell in love with him while he was working at the club. She then tells him that Leo was the one who went to the police about the money laundering, not Mannix. Ivan goes off to find Leo and Delaney worries that Ivan will hurt him and refuses to leave with Raymond. Delaney learns that Ivan shot at Leo, but Terese jumped in front of him and took the bullet. Delaney assures Leo that she did not talk to her father or uncle about him. Leo calls Delaney's mystery contact and discovers that it is Mannix, who explains that after Paul dumped him in the bush, he called Delaney, who took him to a motel where he recovered. Delaney also tells Paul that the body he dug up was an associate of Raymond's. Delaney attempts to apologise, but Paul and Leo order her to go. Leo later tells her she is safe from Raymond and Ivan, who are going back to prison. He suggests that she goes and finds her mother to make a fresh start. They hug and Delaney leaves.

Regina Grundy

Regina "Reggie" Grundy, played by Timba, is a French Bulldog, who made her first appearance on 21 December 2018. Daniel Kilkelly of Digital Spy announced on 17 December that a new dog was being introduced to the show during the 8000th episode. Reg initially belongs to Valerie Grundy (Patti Newton), who dies in the episode. After Reg fails to get along with the Rebecchi's dog, Clancy (Rocky), she is adopted by David Tanaka (Takaya Honda) and Aaron Brennan (Matt Wilson). Valerie and Reg were created as a tribute to Reg Grundy, who produced Neighbours in the 1980s. Timba is owned by Wilson. Reggie departed with Valerie's sister on 23 January 2019.

Reggie continuously barks after her owner Valerie Grundy dies, alerting Toadfish Rebecchi (Ryan Moloney) and Piper Willis (Mavournee Hazel), who enter the house and find Val. After Val's body is removed, Yashvi Rebecchi (Olivia Junkeer) convinces her parents to look after Reggie. Aaron Brennan and David Tanaka take Reggie out for a walk, as she is not getting along with the Rebecchi's dog. Piper tells them that she and Toadie have yet to find any of Val's relations, and it is not guaranteed that they would want Reggie. After speaking with Aaron's brother, David adopts Reggie for himself and Aaron, and brings her home to Number 24. While she is left alone, Reggie ransacks various rooms, leading Aaron to find a Christmas card from his sister Chloe Brennan (April Rose Pengilly) to Elly Conway (Jodi Anasta) amongst the rubbish. Reggie is taken from the Lassiters complex, while David is in the cafe. He and Aaron later spot her with Vera Punt (Sally-Anne Upton), who explains that she is Val's sister. David and Aaron are reluctant to let Reggie go, as they have fallen in love with her, but eventually decide to let her leave with Vera, who later moves into 34 Ramsay Street with Reggie.

Shaun Watkins

Shaun Watkins, played by Brad Moller, made his first appearance on 27 December 2018. Details of Moller's casting were not announced until his first appearance. Shaun was introduced as the younger half-brother of villain Finn Kelly (Rob Mills). He comes to Erinsborough to meet Susan Kennedy (Jackie Woodburne), and prove to her that Finn was not always bad. Shaun was later shown in a trailer promoting 2019 storylines, and Daniel Kilkelly of Digital Spy questioned if he could be trusted or whether he was "just as freaky as Finn? Only time will tell." Writers also involved Shaun in Elly Conway's (Jodi Anasta) relationship problems. They pair have a one-night stand and Elly falls pregnant with his child, giving him an opportunity for blackmail. In May 2020, it was announced that Moller had reprised the role once again, months after Shaun was declared dead.

Shaun leaves a photo album containing childhood photos of Finn Kelly on the doorstep of Susan Kennedy home. Susan and her husband Karl Kennedy (Alan Fletcher) meet Shaun at the local pub The Waterhole, where he reveals that he is Finn's half-brother. Shaun explains that when he and Finn were younger, they were both kidnapped during a trip to South America. Their mother and Shaun's father paid the ransom for Shaun, but not Finn, as they blamed him for the incident. Finn was held captive for six months, until he was rescued by the military. Shaun hopes that by telling Susan the story, she will understand Finn's actions better. Despite finding no record of the incident, Susan meets with Shaun again, who says it was covered up. He gives her an unopened letter from Finn to their mother that he wrote while he was held hostage. Shaun explains that their mother has had no contact with Finn, while his father blamed Finn for his heart attack. Shaun also says that Finn's anger caused him to do terrible things. Susan's niece Bea Nilsson (Bonnie Anderson) contacts Shaun asking to meet, but her boyfriend Ned Willis (Ben Hall) warns Shaun off and he leaves town.

Shaun returns when Finn wakes from his coma and claims to have retrograde amnesia. Shaun supports Finn when he visits Ramsay Street and meets his victims. Ned confronts Shaun and tells him to take Finn away, but Shaun refuses and Ned punches him. Mark Brennan (Scott McGregor) breaks up the fight, and Shaun press charges against Ned. Shaun and Finn's mother Claudia Watkins (Kate Raison) comes to Erinsborough intending to take Shaun home with her. He tries to convince her to visit Finn. Shaun meets Elly Conway at the Back Lane Bar, and they have a one-night stand. Shaun later learns Elly is pregnant and that he is the father. He uses the information to blackmail her into changing her victim impact statement and convince the Kennedys to house Finn. He leaves for Switzerland after seeing Finn settle in. Weeks later, Finn invites Shaun back to Erinsborough, after Elly's marriage ends. He almost gets into a fight with her husband Mark, who knows he is the father of her baby. Shaun tells Elly that he wants to be a part of his baby's life, but Elly is distant. Shaun attends an art class with Elly and they bond over the baby while they draw. Elly invites him to attend the 12-week scan. Mark asks Shaun about the fire at the police forensics locker, but Shaun assures him that he was not involved as he was in Sydney. After seeing how happy Elly is upon talking to Mark, Shaun goes to see Mark and asks if there is a chance they could get back together. Mark refuses to discuss the issue with him. Shaun tells Elly that he is planning on leaving to give her and Mark space, and will return for the birth. Elly later tells him that she and Mark kissed, so she agrees with his decision to leave. After Shaun tells Finn that he is going, he says his goodbyes to everyone and returns to Switzerland.

Shaun comes to Erinsborough to pull Finn into line, after he falls out with David Tanaka (Takaya Honda) and Aaron Brennan (Matt Wilson) over their involvement in Elly's pregnancy. After Finn apologises to David and Aaron, the four men take a baby swaddling class together. Elly returns from Sydney when Bea is injured, and Shaun comforts her when she gets upset. He asks Elly about them starting a relationship, but she turns him down. David finds custody papers in Shaun's bag and Elly accuses Shaun of trying to take her baby. He explains that his mother had the papers drawn up, but he has no intention of filing them and they tear them up. Shaun tells Finn about a program he ran in Switzerland that pairs disadvantaged children with mentors, and they present the idea to Toadfish Rebecchi (Ryan Moloney) for the Sonya Foundation, however, Toadie tells them that Finn cannot be involved as he will not get police clearance to work with children. After Shaun helps Elly to clean up after the school dance, she kisses him. He returns to Switzerland to begin organising his relocation to Erinsborough. A week later, Finn, Bea and Elly learn that Shaun is missing after being caught up in an avalanche while hiking. Claudia soon informs Finn that the search has been called off following a blizzard, and it is now a retrieval mission, leading Finn to declare that Shaun is dead.

Six months later, Shaun is rescued and flies to Melbourne on Claudia's private jet after realising she was there. Upon arrival he is greeted by her and his daughter Aster Conway (Isla Goulas, Scout Bowman). He reveals that while hiking, he injured his ankle before a blizzard and was forced to stay in a log cabin but was unable to leave due to heavy snowfall posing a risk to his life. Upon inquiring why Aster is with Claudia, he discovers his mother's numerous schemes to take custody away from the Kennedys, Elly and Bea, and how she sent Elly to prison for Finn's murder. He tries to convince her to do the right thing, as Susan and Bea arrive and are shocked by his presence. After Claudia turns herself into the police and was charged, Elly was bailed out of prison. Shaun refuses to forgive Claudia. Shaun reunites with Elly and he temporarily moves in with the Kennedys. Shaun breaks down in front of David, and admits that he misses Finn and is shocked and angry at him for what he has done to the residents of Ramsay Street. Bea tells Shaun that Finn made some video diaries and gives him a copy. Shaun watches them and angrily throws his laptop at Karl's garden shed, in front of Elly. Shaun then throws the memory stick, containing the videos into the lake, before announcing to Elly that he has decided to return to Switzerland to sort himself out. He promises to return to Erinsborough for her and Aster, and they say their goodbyes. Shaun returns weeks later and comes to Elly's defence when she is hassled by a journalist. Shaun takes a job as a counsellor at Erinsborough High, and he helps Emmett Donaldson (Ezra Justin), who struggles with maths and making friends. However, Shaun is fired when he admits to leaving the school doors open, which Emmett and his friends took advantage of to vandalise a classroom. Shaun supports Elly when she is rejected by a mother's group for being a murderer, and organises their own parent's group in the garden, where he and Elly have sex. Shaun then asks her to move to Switzerland with him, which she agrees to do. Shaun departs with Elly and Aster to start a new life together in Switzerland. However, Shaun and Elly move to Sydney and amicably split two years later and divide custody of Aster.

Others

References

External links
 Characters and cast at the Official Neighbours website
 Characters and cast at the Internet Movie Database

2018
, Neighbours
2018 in Australian television